The Confessional is a 2008 mixtape by Bishop Lamont. It was distributed by Aftermath Entertainment. An unofficial version was leaked before it was due to be released by DJ Strong.

Production
The Confessional features Xzibit, Glasses Malone, Warren G, Stat Quo, Tha Bizness, Ras Kass, Busta Rhymes and many others. Production was mainly by producers such as Dr. Dre, Focus..., Scott Storch and DJ Khalil also play a big role in production. Other producers such as East Coast heavyweights like Nottz and Bink! also contributed to the mixtape as well. It was hosted by DJ Whoo Kid and presented by Diosece.

Critical reception

The mixtape was positively received, with XXL calling it "G-status, from beginning to end", commenting on Bishop Lamont's "Tight rhymes, sick flows and his ability to adjust his style to different beats".

Track listing

References

2008 debut albums
Albums produced by Bink (record producer)
Albums produced by Dr. Dre
Albums produced by Focus...
Albums produced by Mark Batson
Albums produced by Scott Storch
Albums produced by Tha Bizness
Albums produced by Jake One
2008 mixtape albums
Aftermath Entertainment compilation albums
Aftermath Entertainment albums